See San Domenico di Guzman for namesakes

San Domenico di Guzman is a cardinal-deaconry (titular church for a Cardinal-deacon) and parish church in Rome, dedicated to Saint Dominic of Guzman.

Church 
The church at Via Vincenzo Marmorale 25, in the tenth prefecture of northern Rome, was consecrated on 2 December 2000, to pastorally serve a parish created on 9 February 1977 in the Pope's own Diocese of Rome.

Cardinal-deaconry 
The title was established as cardinal-deaconry (i.e. for a cardinal-deacon) on 18 February 2012.

 (Portuguese) Cardinal-deacon Manuel Monteiro de Castro (18 February 2012 – present)

Sources and external links
 GCatholic Cardinal deaconry, with incumbent biography links 
 GCatholic Church 
 diocesan page (in Italian) on Rome's diocesan website

Titular churches
Churches in the Metropolitan City of Rome Capital